CFUZ-FM is a Canadian radio station which operates community radio programming at 92.9 MHz (FM) in Penticton, British Columbia.

Operated by the Peach City Community Radio Society, the station received approval to broadcast by the CRTC on May 4, 2015. The station began broadcasting at 92.9 MHz (FM) with 49.9 watts on February 1, 2019.

References

External links
Peach City Community Radio Society - peachcityradio.org
 
 

Fuz
Fuz